Niyazi Zulfugar oghlu Taghizade Hajibeyov  (1912–1984) was a prominent Soviet Azerbaijani conductor, and composer of the renowned symphonic mugham "Rast".

Early life
Niyazi was born on August 20, 1912 in Tbilisi in a family of prominent Shusha musicians. His father was the composer Zulfugar Hajibeyov. He is the nephew of Uzeyir Hajibeyov, the founder of the Azeri classical music. He was playing the violin in "Qırmızı Kadet" Turkish military orchestra in 1921. He studied at the Gnessin Music School in Moscow in 1925-1926. In 1929-30 he studied at the Central Musical Technical School in Leningrad (now Saint Petersburg), but dropped out due to health problems. He returned to Baku in 1931. Right after that he was sent to Dagestan where he met his future wife Həchər khanum. Hecher Khanum's family would not approve of the marriage. So she and Niyazi decided to run away and secretly married. They lived a very difficult yet fulfilling life. The great love of his wife gave him strengths to produce most of his masterpieces, which contributed to Azerbaijan's and the musical treasury of the rest of the world.

Works
Niyazi conducted many of the major symphony orchestras in Prague, Berlin, Budapest, Bucharest, New York, Paris, Istanbul, London, Tehran, Beijing and Ulan-Bator and played an important role in making the Azeri classical music known to the world.

Niyazi was also a talented composer. Building upon the traditions of Uzeyir Hajibeyov, he splendidly synthesized the traditional Azeri folk songs and mugam with western classical symphonic music. Niyazi's most significant works include the opera "Khosrow and Shirin" (1942), and the ballet "Chitra" (1960). His symphonic mugam "Rast" achieved worldwide popularity and was included to the repertoire of many symphony orchestras around the world.

Niyazi was the conductor and music director of the Azerbaijan State Symphony orchestra for 46 years, from 1938 to his death. He died on August 2, 1984.

Niyazi was honored as the People's Artist of the USSR (1959) and received the USSR State Prize (1951, 1952) and Hero of Socialist Labour (1982).

See also
List of People's Artists of the Azerbaijan SSR
House-Museum of Niyazi

References

External links
 Listen to Niyazi, Music Section of Azerbaijan International

1912 births
1984 deaths
Azerbaijani composers
Soviet composers
Soviet male composers
Musicians from Tbilisi
People's Artists of the Azerbaijan SSR
People's Artists of Armenia
People's Artists of the USSR
Soviet Azerbaijani people
Baku Academy of Music alumni
20th-century classical musicians
20th-century composers
20th-century male musicians
Azerbaijani conductors (music)
Ballet conductors
Honored Art Workers of the Azerbaijan SSR